Betta pardalotos is a species of fish in the family Osphronemidae. It is native to Asia, where it occurs in the Musi River basin on the island of Sumatra in Indonesia. The species reaches 7.2 cm (2.8 inches) in standard length and is known to be a facultative air-breather. It feeds on insects and other small invertebrates such as zooplankton.

Reproduction
Betta pardalotos is known to be a paternal mouthbrooder.

References

pardalotos
Fish described in 2009
Fish of Indonesia
Taxa named by Heok Hui Tan